Carex renschiana is a tussock-forming species of perennial sedge in the family Cyperaceae. It is native to central parts of Madagascar.

See also
List of Carex species

References

renschiana
Taxa named by Johann Otto Boeckeler
Plants described in 1884
Flora of Madagascar